Gareth Irwin (born 6 March 1981) is a New Zealand cricketer. He played one first-class match in 2002/03 for Northern Districts. He was also part of New Zealand's squad for the 2000 Under-19 Cricket World Cup.

References

External links
 

1981 births
Living people
New Zealand cricketers
Northern Districts cricketers
Cricketers from Hamilton, New Zealand